The Window on World Theme Park is an amusement park in Longtan District, Taoyuan City, Taiwan.

Amusements

Mini World
 Mini Taiwan
 Mini China
 Mini Asia
 Mini Europe
 Mini America

Amusement Park
 Tour Train
 Euro Riverboat
 Wipe Out
 Ball Pits
 Merry-Go-Round
 Roller Coaster
 Bumper Car
 Kid's Bumper Car
 Strawberry Wheel
 Jumping Stars
 Little Pilot
 Mining Train
 Hercules
 Bubu Car
 Rocking Boat
 Mini Jeep
 OPEN-chan Ferris Wheel

Water Park
 Jumbo Wave
 Thunderstorm
 Nile Beach
 Baby Captain
 Water Mania
 Crazy Rapid
 OPEN-chan Water Castle

Shows
 Taiwanese Folk Art Theater
 OPEN! Costume Show
 Lucky's Adventure
 Funny Clowns
 African HOT Show

Transportation
The theme park is accessible by bus from Zhongli Station of Taiwan Railways or Songshan Airport Station of Taipei Metro.

See also
 List of tourist attractions in Taiwan

References

External links

 

1984 establishments in Taiwan
Amusement parks opened in 1984
Amusement parks in Taiwan
Buildings and structures in Taoyuan City
Tourist attractions in Taoyuan City
Miniature parks